The Roman Catholic Archdiocese of Dodoma is an ecclesiastical territory or diocese of the Roman Catholic Church in Tanzania located in the city of Dodoma.

History
 January 28, 1935: Established as Apostolic Prefecture of Dodoma from the Apostolic Vicariate of Bagamoyo, Apostolic Prefecture of Iringa and Apostolic Vicariate of Kilima-Njaro 
 May 10, 1951: Promoted as Apostolic Vicariate of Dodoma
 March 25, 1953: Promoted as Diocese of Dodoma
 November 6, 2014: Promoted as Archdiocese of Dodoma

Special churches
The Cathedral is St. Paul’s Cathedral in Dodoma.

Bishops
 Prefect Apostolic of Dodoma (Roman rite) 
 Fr. Stanislao dell’Addolorata, C.P. (1937.06.16 – 1941)
 Vicar Apostolic of Dodoma (Roman rite) 
 Bishop Anthony Jeremiah Pesce, C.P. (1951.05.10 – 1953.03.25 see below)
 Bishops of Dodoma (Roman rite)
 Bishop Anthony Jeremiah Pesce, C.P. (see above 1953.03.25 – 1971.12.20)
 Bishop Matthias Joseph Isuja (1972.06.26 – 2005.01.15)
 Bishop Juda Thadaeus Ruwa’ichi, O.F.M. Cap. (2005.01.15 - 2010.11.10), appointed Archbishop of Mwanza
 Bishop Gervas John Mwasikwabhila Nyaisonga (2011.03.19 - 2014.02.17), appointed Bishop of Mpanda
Archbishops of Dodoma (Roman rite)
Archbishop Beatus Kinyaiya, O.F.M. Cap. (2014.11.06 -)

Other priest of this diocese who became bishop
Bernardin Francis Mfumbusa, appointed Bishop of Kondoa in 2011

Suffragan Dioceses 

Diocese of Kondoa
Diocese of Singida

See also
Roman Catholicism in Tanzania

References

Sources
 GCatholic.org
 Catholic Hierarchy

Dodoma
Christian organizations established in 1935
Dodoma
Roman Catholic dioceses and prelatures established in the 20th century
Dodoma, Roman Catholic Archdiocese of
Dodoma, Roman Catholic Archdiocese of
1935 establishments in Tanganyika
 
Dodoma